Adivaani is a platform that aims to support indigenous expression and assertion, based in Kolkata, India. It is a publishing, archiving and chronicling outfit of and by indigenous people of India's Adivasi Tribes.

History 
In April 2012, Ruby Hembrom attended a four month publishing course, and on being confronted by the absence, invisibility and erasure of Adivasi representation in the curriculum and discourse, a common feature in many spaces she had been at, the idea began there.

Adivaani was registered as a non-governmental organization on 19 July 2012, and became operational, and have produced 19 books thus far, including to anthologies.

Adivaani is the first publishing outfit of and by indigenous people of India to publish in the English language, Hembrom co-opted two others to collaborate with, one of whom still remains with Adivaani as a volunteer.

Etymology 
Adivaani is a combination of Sanskrit word 'adi' meaning 'first', 'original', 'ancient' or 'earliest', and 'vaani' meaning 'voice'. Adivaani translates to the 'first voices'.

Work 
Adivaani aims to document and disseminate knowledge systems, tangible and intangible cultural facets of Adivasis in English and bi-lingual, creating a database of the authentic Adivasi voice, as recounted by them, using diverse multimedia channels, which can be accessible to indigenous people themselves.

Adivaani has made a documentary film on the making and playing of the Santhal lute and fiddle, the Banam.

Adivaani's first two books were released at the New Delhi World Book Fair, 2013: Gladson Dungdung's 'Whose Country is it anyway?' and, Ruby Hembrom and Boski Jain's 'We Come from the Geese'.

The theme of the book fair was 'Indigenous Voices: Mapping India's Folk and Tribal Literature'.

References

External links 
 https://adivaani.org/
 Wessler, Heinz Werner. (June 3, 2020). From marginalisation to rediscovery of identity: Dalit and Adivasi voices in Hindi literature. Studia Neophilologica. Argington; Routledge, Taylor and Francis Group.
 Dungdung, Gladson. (February 5, 2020). Indian citizenship laws have deep impact on Adivasis . IWGIA.
 Dasgupta, Sangeeta. (September, 2018). Adivasi studies: From a historian's perspective. History Compass. Wiley.

Adivasi